The Beginning is the 54th and final book in the Animorphs series. Unlike other Animorphs books in the main series, but similar to the Megamorphs, all characters conduct narration instead of just one.

Plot summary
Continuing on immediately from The Answer, Rachel attacks the Yeerks in control of the Blade ship, and kills Tom Berenson and his Yeerk, before being killed at the hands of his Yeerk allies shortly after; before she dies, the Ellimist briefly stops time to tell his own story to her and answer a question about her contribution to the war. As soon as her question is answered, Rachel dies. Tom's morph-capable Yeerks escape in the Blade Ship, abandoning the disabled Pool Ship to the Animorphs. Visser One, realizing that he is defeated, leaves Alloran-Semitur-Corrass's body after being knocked unconscious by Ax. The remaining Animorphs, as well as Alloran (freed after more than two decades under Visser One's control over his body), contact the Andalite fleet, who are primed to annihilate Earth. Ax reveals that the non-military Andalites are listening to their communications and will not approve of the fleet's actions should they proceed. The Andalite fleet calls off their plan to destroy Earth and, after hours of negotiations, they promote Ax to rank of Prince and declare the war for Earth over.

In addition, Cassie, at Jake's urging, goes to look for Erek and finds him escaping the Pool ship. She lets him know that they have won the war at last, but promptly tears into him for draining the ship's weapons, which both enabled the Blade ship to get away and caused Rachel's death to be in vain. Erek defends his decision and likewise chastises Cassie for resorting to the tactics that they had used against him.  Ultimately, Cassie tells Erek that he and the Chee can decide whether or not they are ready to reveal their presence to the world now that the war is over, but though he says nothing about it, it is clear to her that the Chee are still unwilling to do so. Cassie and Erek part ways, and it is clear to the former that the latter and his people are no longer friends or allies with the Animorphs.

The Andalites find Rachel's body floating around in space, having been jettisoned by the Blade ship just before the Yeerks escaped.  The Animorphs attend Rachel's funeral, where a statue is erected in her honor.  Tobias, with the permission of Cassie and Naomi, Rachel's mother, flies away with Rachel's ashes to spread them in the sea.  It is also revealed that the Animorphs lived in California, a fact that had not been revealed throughout the course of the series.

The remainder of the book describes the development of the characters over the course of three years after the war. Jake, Marco, and Cassie become instant celebrities, while Ax returns to the Andalite homeworld a hero. Surrendered Yeerks are allowed to choose an animal form in which to become a nothlit. Arbron's Taxxons are granted their wish and become nothlit anacondas or other big snakes, relocated to the Amazon Rainforest. Unable to morph out of his Taxxon form, Arbron is soon killed by poachers. The free Hork-Bajir colony is moved to Yellowstone National Park, protected by Toby Hamee and Cassie. Toby becomes a non-voting member of the US Senate while Cassie serves as an adviser to the President. Humanity develops an alliance with the Andalites. Some developments between the two races are companies such as Microsoft and Nintendo building new electronics and Andalites morphing into humans to experience the sense of taste. Marco embraces his new fame, and winds up becoming the self-proclaimed "spokesman" for the Animorphs, as well as a TV star. Cassie uses her powers in the government to become an activist for the environment and the Hork-Bajir. Jake, however, adjusts less easily than they do to the new conditions and becomes depressed, having minimal contact with his friends and not morphing at all.

A year after the conclusion of the war, Esplin 9466 (formerly Visser Three and later Visser One) is put on trial in The Hague and convicted of crimes against humanity. During Jake's testimony at the trial, Esplin's defense lawyers attempt to discredit Jake by claiming that he himself is a war criminal for his actions, such as his emptying of the Pool ship that killed 17,372 Yeerks. Though this objection is overruled, Jake is deeply shaken by it, as he feels that it, along with many of his actions during the war, was immoral or mistaken. In a bid to cheer Jake up, his friends capture him and dump him into the ocean, thinking that by forcing him into a dolphin morph (dolphins being naturally happy) they can cheer him up. Jake remains aloof, however. Esplin is forced to live out his remaining days without a host in a purple box constructed by the Andalites.

Two years after Esplin 9466's sentencing, Ax is charged with finding the Blade Ship. He notes that the Andalite military is being shrunk back, and that he easily has the most interesting assignment. The ship crew comes across a massive ship of unknown origin and finds a mysterious DNA sample inside it, a polar bear. Ax leads the investigation team. As First Officer Menderash-Postill-Fastill later recalls, the ship came alive and attacked. Menderash broke off from the ship, but they were then attacked by pirates. He is the sole survivor.

Meanwhile, Jake finally concedes to the government and agrees to train special ops teams to use the morphing power to combat terrorists. After a few months of meetings, two Andalite officials approach Jake, and Menderash relays Ax's story. Jake agrees to help. He informs Marco and Cassie, the latter of whom is spending time assessing potential new places for the Hork-Bajir to inhabit with her new boyfriend Ronnie. Cassie offers to come, but Jake declines, saying that her role is over and that she is doing what she wants to do the most. Jake also believes that Cassie will be happier if she stays on Earth. He asks her to find Tobias, who has since shut himself away from the world (save for monthly visits to his mother, Loren) and remains angry at Jake for Rachel's death. Tobias relents and joins Jake on the mission. Marco agrees to come, as well, but only after yelling at Jake, and telling him that he cannot undo his past mistakes, and that, just as during the war, they will only succeed if they follow his instincts, no matter how "crazy, reckless, and ruthless." Jake selects two of his students (Santorelli and Jeanne Gerard) to join the mission.

As the mission is top-secret and unauthorized, Jake and the others conduct a very elaborate plan. Marco knocks out two Andalites who are guarding a shuttle. They use the shuttle to take off and board a captured Yeerk cruiser. They then crash the shuttle into the ground. The official story would be that terrorists overpowered the Andalite guards but could not pilot the ship and crashed. Menderash, following an Andalite tradition, believes it bad luck to board the ship before it is named.  After Tobias notes that it is "beautiful and dangerous and exciting," the group gives it the only fitting name, the Rachel.

After several months in space, the Animorphs find the Blade Ship, only to discover that Ax has been assimilated into an entity only known as The One, which has given Ax a new mouth that splits open the lower part his face. The One threatens to consume the Animorphs, as it had done to Ax. Jake comments on Marco's earlier call to be "crazy, reckless, and ruthless" and, with a smile that Marco notes makes him look like Rachel, orders them to ram the Blade Ship. The series ends with Jake, Tobias, Marco, and Ax's ultimate fates left unknown.

Contributions to the series' story arc
Rachel, Tom, Tom's unnamed Yeerk, Jara Hamee, and Arbron are killed.
The Yeerks lose, and the Andalites declare the war over.
Because of his actions that led to the Blade ship getting away and Rachel's death ultimately being meaningless, the Animorphs end their friendship and alliance with Erek and the other Chee.
Arbron's Taxxons and the surrendering Yeerk forces are allowed to become nothlits and settle on Earth as anacondas.
Visser Three is tried and convicted of war crimes and is sentenced to several consecutive life sentences.
The Andalites make a single morphing cube available to Earth to combat terrorism, on the condition that it only be used for anti-terror operations and that it remain in Andalite custody.
The series ends with an introduction to The One.

Morphs

Trivia 
 The cover is inspired by the album artwork for Hot Rocks 1964–1971 by the Rolling Stones.
 In response to criticism of the cliffhanger ending, which left it ambiguous whether any of the Animorphs (aside from Cassie) survived, K. A. Applegate wrote an open letter saying she intended to show that in war, there are no truly happy endings, and even those who survive are irrevocably changed by their experience.

References

Animorphs books
2001 science fiction novels
2001 American novels
Novels set in outer space
Anti-war novels
Novels with multiple narrators